The Van Wert County Courthouse is a historic governmental building in downtown Van Wert, Ohio, United States.  Located at 121 E. Main Street, the courthouse is a Second Empire structure built in 1876.  It is Van Wert County's third courthouse: when the county was established, the village of Willshire was designated the county seat; Van Wert was made the seat in 1838, and a courthouse-and-jail complex was built in that community in the following year.

Designed by T.J. Tolan, an architect from Fort Wayne, Indiana, the courthouse is a square structure with towers on all four corners. Its architecture combines copious amounts of brick and stone: the foundation and the walls of the first floor are stone, along with the pilasters, columns, and quoins on the upper parts of the exterior, while the walls of the remaining stories and of the tower are built of brick. Tolan employed multiple groundbreaking construction techniques throughout the structure, such as pressed steel; his success in using these innovations earned recognition for both him and the courthouse in a national trade journal. Rising above the front of the courthouse is a clock tower with a statue of Justice placed in a niche.

Today, county officials continue to use the courthouse for everyday operations.  Among the offices in the courthouse are those of the county treasurer, the county recorder, the county auditor, and the Van Wert County Common Pleas Court.  Some other county agencies maintain offices in other locations, such as the county sheriff and the county commissioners.

In 1974, the Van Wert County Courthouse was listed on the National Register of Historic Places, becoming the first building in the county to receive this distinction.  It qualified for inclusion because of its well-preserved historic architecture, which was seen as significant statewide.

References

External links
Van Wert County

Government buildings completed in 1876
County courthouses in Ohio
Courthouses on the National Register of Historic Places in Ohio
National Register of Historic Places in Van Wert County, Ohio
Second Empire architecture in Ohio
Van Wert, Ohio
Buildings and structures in Van Wert County, Ohio
Clock towers in Ohio